Lukas Herzog (born 7 February 1993) is an Austrian former professional ice hockey Goaltender who played with EC VSV, EC Red Bull Salzburg and Dornbirn Bulldogs in the Austrian Hockey League and the Austrian national team.

He represented Austria at the 2019 IIHF World Championship.

During his tenth professional season, having signed with Dornbirn for the 2021–22 season in an attempt to return from long-term injury, Herzog made 13 appearances before he announced his retirement due to injury on 10 January 2022.

References

External links

1993 births
Living people
Austrian ice hockey goaltenders
Dornbirn Bulldogs players
EC Red Bull Salzburg players
EC VSV players
EK Zell am See players
People from Zell am See
Sportspeople from Salzburg (state)